Loyola Higher Secondary School is a private Catholic secondary school located in Kuppayanallur, in the Kanchipuram district of Tamil Nadu, India. The Tamil-medium, co-educational high school was founded by the Jesuits in 1995 and educates students from grades six through twelve.

History

Loyola Higher Secondary School was upgraded from the parish primary school in Ongur, a close-by village, to a middle school, then a high school and finally to a higher secondary school. The first batch of 59 SSLC Students wrote their public exam in 1997 and secured 71% pass, which had risen to 95.4% in 2007. The school is recognized but not aided by the Tamil Nadu government. It is a co-educational Tamil-medium school run by the Jesuits preferentially for the education of the Dalit children of the four Jesuit parishes and more than 20 villages.

See also

 List of Jesuit schools
 List of schools in Tamil Nadu

References  

Jesuit secondary schools in India
Christian schools in Tamil Nadu
High schools and secondary schools in Tamil Nadu
Schools in Kanchipuram district
Tamil-language schools
Educational institutions established in 1995
1995 establishments in Tamil Nadu